Norfolk Catholic Jr./Sr. High School is a parochial Roman Catholic high school located in Norfolk, Nebraska, United States. It is affiliated with Sacred Heart Parish in the Archdiocese of Omaha. Founded in 1926 by Father Daniel Moriarity, the school was originally located at 6th Street and Madison Avenue. In 1961, a separate three-year high school was formed at the current location (24th and Madison Avenue). The 9th grade became part of the high school in 1976.

Extracurricular activities

Nebraska state championships (43)
 Track and field (boys') - 2007, 2017, 2019
 Basketball (girls') - 2008
 Basketball (boys') - 2011
 Cross country (boys') - 2006, 2007, 2008, 2009, 2016
 Drama (one-act play) - 1975, 1979, 1981, 1982, 1983, 1984, 1987, 1989, 1990, 1992, 1993, 2004
 Football - 1983, 1991, 1998, 1999, 2004, 2005, 2010, 2011, 2012, 2017
 Golf (boys') - 1973, 1974, 1976
 Golf (girls') - 2001, 2005
 Speech - 1978, 1979, 1980, 1981, 1982, 1983, 1984, 1987, 1988,
 Wrestling - 2005, 2006

Nebraska state records
Drama - most Drama championships (12)
Football - most state championships (10) 
Football - most touchdown passes in a game, Chris Jessen, 6, vs. Stanton (1999)
Football - most interceptions in a season, Aaron Hughes, 18 (1991)
Football - most interceptions in a game, Aaron Hughes, 5 (1991)
Football - most field goals in a playoff series, Tyler Daake, 5 (2006)
Football - longest field goal in a playoff game, Drew Farlee, 57 yd. vs. Wahoo High (2010)
Football - longest punt return in a playoff game, Devin Neal, 88 yd. vs. North Bend Central (2008)
Football - most state championship victories in a row, 3 (2010-2012)

References

Catholic secondary schools in Nebraska
Schools in Madison County, Nebraska
Educational institutions established in 1926
Roman Catholic Archdiocese of Omaha
Private middle schools in Nebraska
1926 establishments in Nebraska